Humberto Junior Machacón Cabrera (born October 5, 1989) in Barranquilla is a professional volleyball player from Colombia.

He plays as an outside hitter in the Colombian national team and for TSV Herrsching in the German Volleyball Bundesliga.

Career 
Machacón started his professional career in the Liga Vallecaucana de Voleibol in Cali, Colombia. At the age of 21 he was signed by CV Teruel in the Spanish Superliga. With Teruel he won both the league and the cup. He subsequently played for other European clubs in Greece's first league, the Polish PlusLiga and in Turkey. In 2018 he was signed by TSV Herrsching.

Machacón has been part of the Colombian national team since his youth. He participated and placed on the podium in several occasions, like the South American Games 2010, in the Bolivarian Games 2013, in the Southamerican Championship 2014 and in the Central American Games 2018.

References

External links 
 Player profile at TSV Herrsching (de)
 Player profile at Volleyball Bundesliga (de)
 Player profile in the Central American Games 2018.

Colombian sportspeople
Colombian men's volleyball players
Volleyball
Living people
1989 births
South American Games medalists in volleyball
South American Games bronze medalists for Colombia
Central American and Caribbean Games medalists in volleyball
Central American and Caribbean Games silver medalists for Colombia
Competitors at the 2018 Central American and Caribbean Games
Sportspeople from Barranquilla